The Houston Astros' 1985 season was a season in American baseball. It involved the Houston Astros attempting to win the National League West.

Offseason
 December 3, 1984: Manuel Lee was drafted from the Astros by the Toronto Blue Jays in the 1984 rule 5 draft.

Regular season
 July 11, 1985: Nolan Ryan got the 4000th strikeout of his career by striking out Danny Heep of the New York Mets.
 July 27, 1985: The Astros lose to the New York Mets, 16–4, despite not allowing a single earned run in the game.

Season standings

Record vs. opponents

Notable transactions
 June 3, 1985: Mike Simms was drafted by the Astros in the 6th round of the 1985 Major League Baseball draft.
 June 12, 1985: Brad Gulden was purchased by the Houston Astros from the Cincinnati Reds.
 September 15, 1985: Joe Niekro was traded by the Astros to the New York Yankees for Jim Deshaies and players to be named later. The New York Yankees completed the deal by sending Neder Horta (minors) to the Astros on September 24 and Dody Rather (minors) to the Astros on January 11, 1986.

Roster

Player stats

Batting

Starters by position
Note: Pos = Position; G = Games played; AB = At bats; H = Hits; Avg. = Batting average; HR = Home runs; RBI = Runs batted in

Other batters
Note: G = Games played; AB = At bats; H = Hits; Avg. = Batting average; HR = Home runs; RBI = Runs batted in

Pitching

Starting pitchers
Note: G = Games pitched; IP = Innings pitched; W = Wins; L = Losses; ERA = Earned run average; SO = Strikeouts

Other pitchers
Note: G = Games pitched; IP = Innings pitched; W = Wins; L = Losses; ERA = Earned run average; SO = Strikeouts

Relief pitchers
Note: G = Games pitched; W = Wins; L = Losses; SV = Saves; ERA = Earned run average; SO = Strikeouts

Farm system

References

External links
1985 Houston Astros season at Baseball Reference

Houston Astros seasons
Houston Astros season
Houston